Pork tenderloin, also called pork fillet, pork steak or Gentleman's Cut, is a long, thin cut of pork. 

As with all quadrupeds, the tenderloin refers to the psoas major muscle along the central spine portion, ventral to the lumbar vertebrae, the most tender part of the animal, because those muscles are used for posture rather than locomotion.

Products and uses
In some countries, such as the United States and the Netherlands ('varkenshaas'), pork tenderloin can be bought as a processed product, already flavored with a marinade. A regional dish of the Midwestern United States is a pork tenderloin sandwich, also called a tenderloin – a very thinly sliced piece of pork, which is the larger, tougher loineye - or longissimus - muscle, which is battered or breaded, deep fried, and served on a small bun, often with garnishes such as mustard, pickle and onions. This sandwich is relatively common and popular in the U.S. Midwest, especially in the states of Iowa and Indiana. In the southern states, tenderloin is often prepared as a breakfast biscuit, typically with egg or cheese. It is quite common for pork tenderloin to be used as an alternative to beef tenderloin as it can be just as tender but costs significantly less.

In popular culture
Alton Brown's television show Good Eats includes an episode titled "Tender is the Pork" about pork tenderloin.

See also
 Pork tenderloin sandwich
 List of pork dishes

References

Tenderloin

pt:Lombo_(gastronomia)